A periodeutes (plural periodeutai, περιοδευταὶ), sometimes anglicized periodeut, was an itinerant priest in various Eastern Christian churches.

The fifty-seventh canon of the Fourth Council of Laodicea (380) prescribed that the chorepiskopoi  (country bishops) should be replaced by periodeutai, that is, priests who have no fixed residence and act as organs of the city bishops.

In the Maronite Church, a periodeutes (bardūt) is "a kind of vicar forane who acts for the bishop in the inspection of the rural clergy."

In Syriac, the title is periodiota.

Notes

Further reading
 A. Coussa, Epitome praelectionum de jure ecclesiastico orientali I, Grottaferrata, 1948, 343-345
 R. Amadou, "Choréveques et Periodeutes", L'Orient Syrien 4 (1959) 233-41

Eastern Christian ecclesiastical offices
Greek words and phrases